Victor Baluda and Dino Marcan were the defending champions. Number 1 seeds, and 2014 Australian Open Quarterfinalists Alex Bolt and 
Andrew Whittington won their first title as a duo, with a 6–4, 6–3 defeat of Daniel Cox and Gong Maoxin.

Seeds

Draw

Draw

References
 Main Draw

ATP Challenger China Int'l - Doubles
2014 Doubles